Gulf County is a county located in the panhandle of the U.S. state of Florida. As of the 2020 census, the population was 14,192. Its county seat is Port St. Joe.

Gulf County is included in the Panama City, FL Metropolitan Statistical Area.

History
Gulf County, created in 1925, was named for the Gulf of Mexico. Wewahitchka was its first county seat and the 1927 Gulf County Courthouse is still in existence. In 1965 the county seat was moved to Port Saint Joe, which under its original name Saint Joseph, had been the site of Florida's first Constitutional Convention in 1838.

Geography

Communities

Cities
 Port St. Joe
 Wewahitchka

Unincorporated communities
Unincorporated areas include:
 Cape San Blas
 Dalkeith
 Highland View
 Honeyville
 Howard Creek
 Indian Pass
 Oak Grove
 Overstreet
 St. Joe Beach
 White City

Time zones
By way of the Intracoastal Waterway, Gulf County is one of a small number of counties in the United States to be in two time zones, Eastern and Central in this case.

Adjacent counties
 Calhoun County, Florida — north
 Liberty County, Florida — northeast
 Franklin County, Florida — east
 Bay County, Florida — west

National protected area
 St. Vincent National Wildlife Refuge (part)

Demographics

As of the 2020 United States census, there were 14,192 people, 5,897 households, and 3,940 families residing in the county.

As of the census of 2000, there were 13,332 people, 4,931 households, and 3,535 families residing in the county. There were 7,587 housing units at an average density of 14 per square mile (5/km2). The racial makeup of the county was 79.89% White, 16.94% Black or African American, 0.65% Native American, 0.40% Asian, 0.05% Pacific Islander, 0.53% from other races, and 1.55% from two or more races. 2.03% of the population were Hispanic or Latino of any race.

There were 4,931 households, out of which 28.40% had children under the age of 18 living with them, 55.50% were married couples living together, 11.90% had a female householder with no husband present, and 28.30% were non-families. 25.50% of all households were made up of individuals, and 11.40% had someone living alone who was 65 years of age or older. The average household size was 2.42 and the average family size was 2.87.

In the county, the population was spread out, with 21.70% under the age of 18, 6.80% from 18 to 24, 29.40% from 25 to 44, 26.00% from 45 to 64, and 16.20% who were 65 years of age or older. The median age was 40 years. For every 100 females, there were 114.60 males. For every 100 females age 18 and over, there were 116.70 males.

The median income for a household in the county was $30,276, and the median income for a family was $36,289. Males had a median income of $27,539 versus $20,780 for females. The per capita income for the county was $14,449. About 13.70% of families and 16.70% of the population were below the poverty line, including 20.80% of those under age 18 and 14.10% of those age 65 or over.

Politics
Once heavily Democratic, in 1964 Gulf County transitioned to a majority Republican county.  As of June 2020 Gulf County has 10,300 registered active voters.  The Republican party holds a 52% (5,370 Voters) to 34% (3,494 voters) advantage over the Democratic Party.  The remaining voters are registered with No Party Affiliation or are scattered across a number of minority parties.

The County Commission is a five-member board consisting of three Republicans and two Democrats.  Republicans control five of the six elected Constitutional Offices in the county including Sheriff, Superintendent of Schools, Property Appraiser, Clerk of the Court and Supervisor of Elections.  The office of Tax Collector is the only Constitutional Office filled by a Democrat.

At the state level, Gulf County is represented by District 3 Democratic Senator Bill Montford and District 7 Republican Representative Jason Shoaf.

Gulf County is a part of Florida's 2nd Congressional District and is represented by Neal Dunn.

Education
Gulf County is served by Gulf County Schools.

Libraries
Gulf County is part of the Northwest Regional Library System (NWRLS), which serves Bay and Liberty Counties as well.
 Bay County Public Library
 Panama City Beach Public Library
 Parker Public Library
 Springfield Public Library
 Gulf County Public Library
 Charles Whitehead Public Library
 Harrell Memorial Library of Liberty County
 Jimmy Weaver Memorial Library

Transportation

Airports
 Costin Airport

See also
 National Register of Historic Places listings in Gulf County, Florida

Notes

References

External links

Government links/Constitutional offices
 Gulf County Board of County Commissioners
 Gulf County Supervisor of Elections
 Gulf County Property Appraiser
 Gulf County Sheriff's Office
 Gulf County Tax Collector

Special districts
 Gulf County School District
 Northwest Florida Water Management District

Judicial branch
 Gulf County Clerk of Courts
 Circuit and County Court for the 14th Judicial Circuit of Florida serving Bay, Calhoun, Gulf, Holmes, Jackson and Washington counties

Tourism links
 Gulf County Tourism Development Council

Business links
 Gulf County Chamber of Commerce

 
1925 establishments in Florida
Counties in multiple time zones
Florida counties
North Florida
Populated places established in 1925